Glorianne Aurore "Gloria" Perrier (March 21, 1929 – March 7, 2015) was an American sprint canoer who competed in the 1960s. Competing in two Summer Olympics, she won a silver medal in the K-2 500 m event at Tokyo in 1964 with her K-2 partner Francine Fox.

External links
 
 
 

1929 births
2015 deaths
American female canoeists
Canoeists at the 1960 Summer Olympics
Canoeists at the 1964 Summer Olympics
Olympic silver medalists for the United States in canoeing
Medalists at the 1964 Summer Olympics
21st-century American women